9,10-Diphenylanthracene is a polycyclic aromatic hydrocarbon. It has the appearance of a slightly yellow powder. 9,10-Diphenylanthracene is used as a sensitiser in chemiluminescence. In lightsticks it is used to produce blue light.  It is a molecular organic semiconductor, used in blue OLEDs and OLED-based displays.

See also
 2-Chloro-9,10-diphenylanthracene, a chlorinated derivative

References

External links
 Polycyclic aromatic hydrocarbons, Australian National Pollutant Inventory

Organic semiconductors
Anthracenes